The 1946 NCAA Cross Country Championships were the eighth annual cross country meet to determine the team and individual national champions of men's collegiate cross country running in the United States.

Since the current multi-division format for NCAA championship did not begin until 1973, all NCAA members were eligible. In total, 28 teams contested this championship.

The meet was hosted by Michigan State College at the Forest Akers East Golf Course in East Lansing, Michigan for the eighth consecutive time. Additionally, the distance for the race was 4 miles (6.4 kilometers). 

The team national championship was retained again by the Drake Bulldogs, their third overall. The individual championship was won by Quentin Brelsford, from Ohio Wesleyan, with a time of 20:22.9.

Men's title
Distance: 4 miles (6.4 kilometers)

Team Result (top 10)

References
 

NCAA Cross Country Championships
NCAA Men's Cross Country Championships
Sports competitions in East Lansing, Michigan
NCAA Cross Country
November 1946 sports events in the United States
Michigan State University
Track and field in Michigan